José María Tranquilino Fernández Marín Sr. (June 6, 1896  July 20, 1972) was a Cuban baseball catcher and manager in the Negro leagues from the 1910s to the 1940s.

A native of Guanabacoa, Cuba, Fernández was the brother of fellow Negro leaguer Rudy Fernández. He managed the New York Cubans for 12 consecutive seasons from 1939 to 1950. Fernández died in Guanabacoa in 1972 at age 76.

References

External links
 and Baseball-Reference Black Baseball stats and Seamheads
  and Seamheads
 José Fernandez at Negro League Baseball Museum

1896 births
1972 deaths
Chicago American Giants players
Cuban baseball coaches
Cuban expatriates in the United States
Cuban House of David players
Cuban Stars (East) players
San Francisco Park players
Negro league baseball managers
New York Cubans players
Baseball catchers
Baseball players from Havana